Sertse Podillia  is a Ukrainian professional men's volleyball team, based in Vinnytsia, playing in Ukrainian Super League.

Achievements
 Ukrainian Super League
  (x1) 2019
 Ukrainian Cup
  (x1) 2019

Team roster
Team roster in season 2019-20

Technical staff

Notable players
Notable, former or current players of the club.

References

External links
Official site

Ukrainian volleyball clubs
Sport in Vinnytsia